American R&B girl group Destiny's Child has released five studio albums, five compilation albums, two remix albums, one extended play, twenty-three singles, including four as featured artists and two promotional singles, and three video albums.

Destiny's Child first charted in November 1997, and released their self-titled debut album in the United States in February 1998 and it peaked at number 67 on the Billboard 200. It earned a platinum certification in the United States by the Recording Industry Association of America (RIAA). The album's lead single, "No, No, No", reached number three on the Billboard Hot 100 and was certified platinum by the RIAA. Second album, The Writing's on the Wall, was released in July 1999, and was their breakthrough release peaking at number 5 on the Billboard 200. The first and third single, "Bills, Bills, Bills" and "Say My Name", peaked atop the US Billboard Hot 100. The album eventually sold over eight million copies in the United States, gaining eight-times platinum certification by the RIAA. Destiny's Child then released the theme song for Charlie's Angels. Titled "Independent Women Part 1", it spent eleven consecutive weeks at number one on the Billboard Hot 100, becoming the longest running number one of that year.

The group's third album, Survivor, was released in the spring of 2001 and reached number one on Billboard 200. The title track reached number 2 in the US and follow-up single "Bootylicious" was their fourth number one song. In March 2002, a remix compilation titled This Is the Remix was released. After a three-year hiatus working on solo projects, the group reunited to record their fifth and final studio album, Destiny Fulfilled, released in November 2004. The album reached number two in the US and was certified three-time platinum. Four singles were released from the album: "Lose My Breath", "Soldier", "Girl", and "Cater 2 U". The first two singles reached number three in US. A final greatest hits album, #1's, was released in October 2005 following their split. To date, Destiny's Child has sold 17.5 million albums in the US and over 60 million records worldwide. Billboard magazine ranks the group as one of the greatest female acts of all time, and inducted the group in 2008 into the All time Hot 100 Artist.

Albums

Studio albums

Compilation albums

Remix albums

Extended plays

Singles

As lead artist

As featured artist

Promotional singles

Other charted songs

Soundtrack appearances

Videography

Video singles

Video albums

Music videos

As lead artist

Footnotes

See also
 List of Destiny's Child songs
 Beyoncé discography
 Kelly Rowland discography
 Michelle Williams discography
 LeToya Luckett discography

References

Discography
Rhythm and blues discographies
Discographies of American artists